Sadgorgan va Ettehad Seh (also Romanized as Sadgorgān va Etteḩād Seh) is a village in Mazraeh-ye Shomali Rural District, Voshmgir District, Aqqala County, Golestan Province, Iran. At the 2006 census, its population was 118, in 23 families.

References 

Populated places in Aqqala County